Spy × Family is a Japanese manga series written and illustrated by Tatsuya Endo. The series began serialization on the manga website Shōnen Jump+ on March 25, 2019. Its individual chapters have been collected into ten tankōbon volumes, with the first having been released on July 4, 2019. The series is licensed for English-language release in North America by Viz Media, who published the first volume on June 2, 2020. As the series is published in Japan, it is also released simultaneously in English digitally on Viz Media's website.

The covers of the tankōbon features a main character resting on a designer's chair, surrounded by item(s) or characteristics that represent the character, their life and their personalities. The real life chairs were chosen by the author as he deemed fit with the character's personalities. For volume 10, Endo decides to forgo the inclusion of the designer chair to make the cover befit the story of the volume.



Volume list

Chapters not yet in tankōbon format 
These chapters have yet to be published in a tankōbon volume. They were serialized on Shōnen Jump+.
Mission: 67–76
Short Mission: 9

Notes

References 

Spy X Family
Spy × Family